ATL Homicide is an American true crime television series that airs on TV One. ATL Homicide debuted on July 9, 2018.

Plot
Veteran Atlanta homicide detectives David Quinn and Vince Velazquez investigate crimes, from high-profile murders to everyday "who-done-its."

The TV show, which debuted Summer 2018, features these two retired Atlanta Detectives re-telling their most fascinating cases via narration and re-enactment using actors, Angelo Diaz and Chris Diaz, also known as The Diaz Brothers.

Production
On May 13, 2019, it was announced that the second season would premiere on June 17, 2019.

On January 20, 2021, it was announced that the third season would premiere on January 25, 2021.

References

External links
ATL Homicide at TV One website

2018 American television series debuts
Television shows set in Atlanta
True crime television series
TV One (American TV channel) original programming